Karate at the 2013 Islamic Solidarity Games was held at Sriwijaya Promotion Center, Palembang, Indonesia from 23 to 25 September 2013

Medal summary

Men

Women

Medal table

References 

Complete Results
Results

External links
Official website
2013 South Sumatera

2013 Islamic Solidarity Games
2013 in karate
2013